Sayako (written: 清子 or 紗冶子) is a feminine Japanese given name. Notable people with the name include:

 , a former princess of the Japanese Imperial Family, daughter and youngest child of Emperor Akihito
 , Japanese television personality
 , Japanese artist
 , Japanese actress

See also
 Sayaka
 Sayoko

Japanese feminine given names